Goonda Guru is a 1985 Indian Kannada film,  directed by  A. T. Raghu and produced by S. Ramnath and Chandulal Jain. The film stars Ambareesh, Geetha, Vajramuni, Hema Choudhary and Sundar Krishna Urs in the lead roles. The film has musical score by M. Ranga Rao.

Cast

Ambareesh
Geetha
Vajramuni
Hema Choudhary
Sundar Krishna Urs
Srilalitha
Shashikala
N.S. Rao
Mysore Lokesh
Shankar Rao
Gode Lakshminarayan
Hanumanthachar
Comedian Guggu
Chethan Ramarao
Kalale Dore
Ashwath Narayan
Manjumalini
Rathnamala
Bhavani
Kalpana
Renuka
Sharadamma
Thulasibai
Mangalamma
Saraswathibai
Jayamma
Kasthuri
Indira
Master Manjunath
Shivaram in Guest Appearance

References

External links
 

1985 films
1980s Kannada-language films
Films scored by M. Ranga Rao